Saint Pragmatius of Autun (fl. c.520) was Bishop of Autun in the 6th century. He was a  friend of Sidonius Apollinaris and Avitus of Vienne, and he participated in at least one of the councils of his time. He is venerated as a saint by the Roman Catholic Church; his feast day is celebrated on 22 November.

References

Bishops of Autun
6th-century Christian saints
Gallo-Roman saints
Year of birth unknown